Ofer Ben-Amots (Hebrew: עופר בן-אמוץ; born October 20, 1955) is an Israeli-American composer and teacher of music composition and theory at Colorado College. His music is inspired by Jewish folklore of Eastern-European Yiddish and Judeo-Spanish Ladino traditions. The interweaving of folk elements with contemporary textures creates the dynamic tension that permeates and defines Ben-Amots' musical language.

Biography
Born in Haifa, Israel, Ofer Ben-Amots gave his first piano concert at age nine and at age sixteen was awarded first prize in the Chet Piano Competition. Later, following composition studies with Joseph Dorfman at Tel Aviv University, he was invited to study at the Conservatoire de Musique in Geneva, Switzerland. There he studied with Pierre Wismer and privately with Alberto Ginastera. Ben-Amots is an alumnus of the Hochschule für Musik in Detmold, Germany, where he studied with Martin C. Redel and Dietrich Manicke and graduated with degrees in composition, music theory, and piano. Upon his arrival in the United States in 1987, Ben-Amots studied with George Crumb at the University of Pennsylvania where he received his Ph.D. in music composition. Currently on the faculty of Colorado College, Ben-Amots is a Professor of music composition and theory. In addition, Ben-Amots is a member of the Advisory Board and the Editorial Board of the Milken Archive of American-Jewish Music and is a Jerusalem Fellow of the Center for Jewish Culture and Creativity. In 1997, he became the Center for Jewish Culture and Creativity's Artistic Director for North America.

Ben-Amots' music has been published by Kallisti Music Press, Muramatsu Inc., Dorn, Tara Publications, and the Composer's Own Press. It can be heard on Naxos Records, Vantage, Plæne, Stylton, and Music Sources recording labels.

Awards
Ofer Ben-Amots was the winner of the 1994 Vienna International Competition for Composers with his comic opera, Fool's Paradise (opera). The chamber opera is based on a short story by Isaac Bashevis Singer. Though short, the story includes a rich scope of important life experiences such as childhood and adolescence, love, death, resurrection. Ben-Amots did not write the opera with a traditional adult audience in mind. Instead, he looked to inspire and excite children's imaginations.  To do so, he argues, one must use "clear simple language and allow for some mystery and magic". To allow for such mystery and magic, Ben-Amots assigned one instrument or group of instruments to each of the seven characters in the opera. However, the instrumentation and story can be appreciated, admired, and enjoyed by adults as well. Because there is such a wide range of instruments used for this opera, a regular symphonic orchestra is not needed. Thus, it is up to the soloist to portray important feelings as well as demonstrate the ability of their instrument. Finally, the message of the story is simply that life is always better than death—that Paradise exists only on earth. Ben-Amots argues that this is an important lesson for both children and adults. Fool's Paradise was premiered in Vienna and subsequently became part of the 1994/95 season of Opernhaus Zürich.

Ben-Amots' Avis Urbanus for amplified flute was awarded First Prize at the 1991 Kobe International Competition for Flute Composition in Japan, and was then a required composition at the 1993 Kobe Flute Competition. In 1999, Ben-Amots was awarded the Aaron Copland Award and the Music Composition Artist Fellowship by the Colorado Council on the Arts. In 2004 he won the Festiladino, an international contest for Judeo-Spanish songs, a part of the Israel Festival in Jerusalem.

Discography
 Celestial Dialogues (2004)
 Te Laudamus (2007)

Compositions

Stage music
 Pierrot,  ballet Suite for symphony orchestra. 1981 (50')
 Story Number 2,  for small orchestra and Narrator Text  written by Eugène Ionesco.1983/88 (13')
 Fool's Paradise (opera), opera buffa in five scenes. Based on a story by Isaac Bashevis Singer. 1993-94 (80')
 The Dybbuk: Between Two Worlds, multimedia chamber opera in three acts. 2007 (90')

Voice and orchestra
 Shirat Israel, cantata for mezzo-soprano and orchestra.  Hebrew text by Ch. N. Bialik. 1978 (12')
 The Joyce Cycle,  for middle voice and symphony orchestra  Lyrics written by James Joyce. 1984-85 (25')
 Celestial Dialogues, for voice, clarinet and string orchestra.  1994 (30')
 The Dybbuk Suite, for chamber symphony and a solo vocalist. 2002 (17')
 Songs from the Pomegranate Garden, a Judeo-Spanish cycle for chamber symphony and a mezzo-soprano. 2004/05 (22')

Orchestra music
 Fanfare, for symphony orchestra, Kavannagh Prize Awarded. 1988 (6')
 Variations on a French Children's Song, for symphony orchestra. 1992 (7')
 Mt. Fuji Ceremonial Fanfare,  for symphonic band. 1996 (10')
 The Klezmer Concerto, for clarinet solo, string orchestra, harp and percussion. 2006 (25')
 Concertino - From Darkness to Light, for clarinet, mandolin, and orchestra. 2012 (24')

Choir and instruments
 Al Naharot Bavel  (By the Rivers of Babylon), four part canon for mixed choir, Piano and Percussion Text Psalm 137. 1988 (4')
 Psalm 81  (Upon Gitith), for mixed choir and Metal Percussion.  Text: Psalm 81. 1989 (13')
 Hashkivenu  (Cause us, Oh God to Lie Down in Peace), for SATB Chorus, organ and mixed percussion. 1989/90 (8')
 Three Love Songs,  for Mixed Choir and Piano Accompaniment. 1991 (5')
 Mizmor – Ten Degrees of Praise (Psalm 150), for soprano solo, clarinet, men's choir, and percussion. 2003 (11')
 The Heart and the Fountain, for SATB Chorus or for Female chorus with misc. percussion. 2006 (8'30")
 A Fool's Journey, for 8-Part mixed chorus, piano and percussion Lyrics written by Süsskind von Trimberg  (13th century) 1996, Rev. 2008  (12')

Choir a cappella
 Hineh Al Heharim  (Here on the Mountains), four to eight part canon for mixed choir a  cappella. Text: Nachum 2, 1-3. 1987 (4'30")
 Ma Tishtochachi Nafshi   (Why So Downcast, My Soul), - for mixed chorus.  Text: Psalm 42. 1987/88 (5'30")
 Yeeheyu Le'ratzon   (May the Words), for SATB Chorus. Text out of the Amidah prayer. 1989/90 (5')
 Five Hassidic Songs, for SATB Chorus or Female chorus. Arrangements of traditional Hassidic songs with or without piano accompaniment. 1999/2000 (10')

Vocal chamber music
 Shtetl Songs, for voice and piano  (also a version for mixed chorus) 1985/86 (18')
 Psalm 23, for Soprano, Clarinet and Percussion.  1990 (5')
 Kinah (Lament),  for piano and high-voice 1998 (8')
 Songs from the Pomegranate Garden, for voice and piano. Based on Judeo-Spanish songs. 2004 (20')
 Kantigas Ulvidadas (Judeo-Spanish), for voice and piano. 2006 (10')
 The Dybbuk Song Cycle, for voice and piano. Based on the opera. 2008 (25')
 The Sweet Pain of Love, for violin and voice, to a poem by Nathan Zach. 2008 (9')

Instrumental chamber music
 Ceremonial Music, for saxophone, trumpet and piano. 1982 (11')
 Hashkivenu,  for string quartet.  1982 (10')
 Sonata,  for cello and piano. 1982 (23')
 Five Ancient Dances, for clarinet (or flute) and piano. 1983 (13')
 Midnight Dance, for violin (or cello) and piano. 1996 (8')
 Cantillations, for clarinet and cello (or viola) 1997 (10')
 Prophetic Tropes, (Te'amey Nevu'ah,) for trombone (or bass trombone) and extended piano. 1989/99 (11')
 Elemental Drums, Music for Dance. for mixed wind ensemble, 3 percussionists, and guitar. 1997 (12')
 The Queen City Fanfare, for trumpet and organ (version for solo trumpet and brass choir) 2002 (5')
 The Queen City Fanfare, (Inaugural Fanfare,) an additional version for oboe, piano, and percussion. 2002 (5')
 The Odessa Trio (in memory of J. Dorfman,) for violin, cello and piano. 2008-2014 (25')
 From Darkness to Light, A trio for clarinet (or guitar,) mandolin, and piano. 2013 (24')
 The Curved Road for fl., cl., bn., vln., vla., vlc., and pno. 2015 (7' 30")

Piano and organ solo
 Toccata  1978
 Scherzo  1978
 Etude in C  1984
 Praeludium and Fuga in C 1984
 Piano Pieces for Children 1983/89
 Sonatina 1984
– Praeludium
– Midnight Dance
– Mosquito
– Tambourine
 Haunted Toccata 1990
 Untitled No. 1 1990
 Akëda, 2000 (8')
 The Organ Book of Psalms, for organ solo 1998/2008
– Mystical Procession 1999 (5')
– Pastoral Invocation 1998 (7')
– The Q Anthem 1999 (5')
– Teru'ah (Recessional) 2008 (5')

Other solo instruments
 Miniatures et Collage, for flute. 1977 (5'30")
 Avis Urbanus, for amplified flute. 1990 (10')
 I, Jerusalem ..., for any size clarinet solo. 1991 (4')
 A Letter to Avigdor, for violin solo. Commissioned by Avigdor Zamir. 1990/99 (10')
 The Angel's Lament, for clarinet solo. Commissioned by Guido Arbonelli. 1999 (60")
 The Red Curtain Dance, for oboe or clarinet solo. 2003 (6')

Orchestral arrangements
 Armenian Suite, by Richard Yardumian. A reduction of the original score, for small symphonic orchestra. 1992
 Massada, - Opera in three acts by Fredrick Kaufman.  A piano reduction of the original score. 1990

References

External links
 Official Website
 The Dybbuk Project - A Multimedia Chamber opera
 A Dialogue with Ofer Ben-Amots
 Fool's Paradise - Official Website
 Ofer Ben-Amots on Youtube

1955 births
Living people
Israeli opera composers
Israeli emigrants to the United States
Israeli Jews
Jewish American composers
University of Pennsylvania School of Arts and Sciences alumni
Colorado College faculty
Hochschule für Musik Detmold alumni
Jewish opera composers
21st-century American Jews